Medhurst Green is a hamlet in Cheshire, England that forms part of the civil parish of Brereton. It consists mainly of two farms, Upper and Lower Medhurst Green Farm, which were also known as Meadowsgreen Farm and Lower Meadowsgreen Farm. The hamlet is served by a bus stop near Upper Medhurst Green Farm.

References

Villages in Cheshire